is a 2008 Japanese horror film and sequel, directed by Shinya Tsukamoto, to the 2007 film Nightmare Detective,  starring Ryuhei Matsuda as Kyoichi Kaganuma.

Plot

Still haunted by his unwanted abilities, which allows him to enter other people's dreams, and memories of his mother dying when he was a child, Kyoichi Kagenuma (Ryuhei Matsuda) contemplates suicide while slowly drowns in his world of misery. Yukie Mashiro (Yui Miura), having heard rumours about Kagenuma's extraordinary abilities, visits his home to beg for his help.

She tells him she suffers from nightly nightmares that are getting scarier. The murderous ghost in the dreams has already killed two of her friends and she's afraid she's the next to die. She believes that only Kagenuma could save her. Kagenuma ignores her pleas for help. Yukie, refusing to give up, returns every day to change his mind.

Kagenuma finally decides to take on Yukie's case to understand the circumstances of his mother's death. It, however, demands from Kagenuma more than he expected to give while it leads him into the darkest corners of dreamscape.

Cast

Production
The character of Lt. Keiko Kirishima was meant to return in the sequel, but Hitomi declined to reprise her role.

Reception
The film received generally positive reviews.

Twitchfilm reviewer Ard Fijn gave it a positive review, writing, "Shinya Tsukamoto has made a very impressive film with some strong statements about loss and grief, and has wrapped this in a fantasy horror mystery thriller. People expecting a regular entry from one of those four genres are in for either a rude awakening or a pleasant surprise. For me "Nightmare Detective 2" was a pleasant surprise, but many people I spoke with after the viewing were less enamored by the convoluted story."

Japancinema reviewed the film positively, stating, "Nightmare Detective 2 can actually be viewed as a stand alone film, however, watching the original first is always advisable. One big hurdle for viewers to overcome is the fact that this film is jam-packed with ambiguity from start to finish but I urge you not to be driven to frustration. The first film had a visceral brutality to it, as this one on the other hand, can be described as a slow ride into silent darkness." The review suggested that a third film would be welcomed.

Rowthree.com gave the film 4 out of a possible 5 and also commented that he would embrace a third movie, writing, "I for one truly hope that Tsukamoto and Matsuda will return one final time and wrap the story up in a trilogy. I am sure we will be left with as many questions as answers when everything is done but with a character so compelling and Tsukamoto's unique vision into dreams I for one welcome the challenge of revisiting the Nightmare Detective again."

References

External links
 
 
 Review by 7tmd.com

2008 horror films
2008 films
2008 fantasy films
Japanese detective films
Japanese horror films
Japanese supernatural horror films
Films directed by Shinya Tsukamoto
Films scored by Chu Ishikawa
Films about nightmares
2000s Japanese films